Greenway Court is a historic country estate near White Post in rural Clarke County, Virginia.  The property is the site of the seat of the vast 18th-century land empire of Thomas Fairfax, 6th Lord Fairfax of Cameron (1693-1781), the only ennobled British colonial proprietor to live in one of the North American colonies.  The surviving remnants of his complex — a later replacement brick house and Fairfax's stone land office — were designated a National Historic Landmark in 1960.

Description
Greenway Court is located down a long private drive on the west side of White Post Road south of the village of White Post. Its principal feature today is a brick farmhouse built in 1828, the original plantation house having been demolished c. 1834. The main historic structure surviving from the period of the Fairfax residency is the Land Office, a c. 1762 single-story gable-roofed limestone structure, and there is also a timber smokehouse dating to the 18th century.

History

Greenway Court was the center of the "Northern Neck Proprietary" or "Fairfax Grant", which passed to Thomas Fairfax, 6th Lord Fairfax of Cameron from his mother's family, the Culpepers, who had taken proprietorship of the land in 1673.  Fairfax laid out the Greenway Court estate in 1747, intending it to be a much larger establishment than it became.  The main house was a -story timber structure with long sloping roofs and corbelled brick chimneys.  It was originally intended to house the land steward, but it was occupied by Fairfax with his nephew, Thomas Bryan Martin, until his death in 1781.  Fairfax employed a young George Washington as a surveyor on his extensive land holdings.

Abandoned, the roof of the main house at Greenway Court collapsed in 1834, after which the structure was pulled down.

A visit to this estate is the subject of "A Night at Greenway Court," an 1896 short story by Willa Cather.

Unincorporated community
Greenway Court is used as a name to describe the unincorporated community in which the former estate is located.

See also
List of National Historic Landmarks in Virginia
National Register of Historic Places listings in Clarke County, Virginia

References

External links

Greenway Court, Clarke County, one photo at Virginia DHR

Farms on the National Register of Historic Places in Virginia
National Historic Landmarks in Virginia
Unincorporated communities in Clarke County, Virginia
Unincorporated communities in Virginia
Fairfax family residences
Plantations in Virginia
Buildings and structures in Clarke County, Virginia
Historic American Buildings Survey in Virginia
National Register of Historic Places in Clarke County, Virginia
Houses on the National Register of Historic Places in Virginia